Bruno Biehler (19 July 1884 – 24 March 1966) was a German architect. His work was part of the architecture event in the art competition at the 1936 Summer Olympics.

References

1884 births
1966 deaths
20th-century German architects
Olympic competitors in art competitions
People from Freiburg im Breisgau